Olivier Biaggi (born 17 March 1971) is a retired Swiss football midfielder.

Honours

Player
FC Sion
Swiss Championship: 1991–92, 1996–97
Swiss Cup: 1996–97

References

1971 births
Living people
Swiss men's footballers
FC Sion players
FC Lausanne-Sport players
Servette FC players
Yverdon-Sport FC players
FC Lugano players
FC Luzern players
Association football midfielders
Swiss Super League players